Camp Shanks was a United States Army installation in the Orangetown, New York area. Named after Major General David C. Shanks, it was situated near the juncture of the Erie Railroad and the Hudson River. The camp was the largest U.S. Army embarkation camp used during World War II.

History
Camp Shanks served as a staging area for troops departing the New York Port of Embarkation for overseas service during World War II. In 1945, Camp Shanks also housed German and Italian prisoners of war.

After the war, old barracks buildings at Camp Shanks were converted into housing for veterans with families attending colleges and universities in the New York City area under the GI Bill; the settlement, then known as Shanks Village, closed in 1954, and the land Camp Shanks once stood on was returned to civilian control. Today, the expanded Palisades Interstate Parkway passes through some of the land that was once Camp Shanks

A small museum opened near the site, at the intersection of New York State Routes 303 and 340 in June 1994.

Construction
One hundred thirty families lost their homes. If the United States was to transport troops and equipment to Europe, it had to expand its military facilities around New York City. Colonel Drew C. Eberson, U.S. Army Corps of Engineers, was the Chief Engineer during construction.

Camp Shanks was a rush job, completed between September 1942 and May 1943 at a cost of $44,391,335. Charges of corruption, petty theft, and disorderly behavior by workmen plagued the project. In June 1946, a federal grand jury cleared the military and the contractors of charges of graft, but acknowledged major problems among some of the labor unions, primarily consisting of a gigantic kickback system. Camp Shanks officially opened January 4, 1943, under the command of Colonel Kenna G. Eastman. The barracks in which the transient soldiers lived measured 20 feet by 100 feet and consisted of two rows of bunks and three coal-burning pot-belly stoves which provided the limited heat. Two WAC detachments, consisting of over 400 women, were assigned to the camp, and filled positions ranging from clerk to mechanic to warehouse staff to armorer. Their freedom of movement on the installation was restricted.

Active years
Camp Shanks comprised one of three staging areas on the eastern seaboard. The other two, Fort Hamilton in Brooklyn, and Camp Kilmer in New Brunswick, NJ, when combined with Camp Shanks, made the area the largest staging area in the world. One of the primary functions as a staging area was to ensure each soldier and WAC left the U.S. fully equipped before crossing the Atlantic. The final field inspection at Camp Shanks identified any problems, made any necessary repairs, and replaced anything which could not be repaired. At the beginning of the war, no large depots existed in England from which soldiers could get their equipment. They carried their essentials with them in their backpacks or barracks bags.

During the second half of 1944, Camp Shanks was sending tens of thousands of troops overseas. Staging peaked in Oct 44, when 78,354 troops arrived while 85,805 troops departed. By the end of Nov 44, all staging areas in the U.S. stopped their final field inspections. Shortages and replacements could be handled from supply depots in England.  When the soldiers were notified that they were on "Alert" status, they knew they would be shipping out within twelve hours. The soldiers removed their division sleeve patches, and their helmets were chalked with a letter and a number, indicating the proper marching order from the camp to the train and the railroad car to ride in. It was a short train ride to the New Jersey docks, and a harbor boat ferried troops to a waiting troopship. One source also advised that troops marched the four miles (6 km) from the camp to the Piermont Pier where they boarded troopships.

Prisoner of war camp
Camp Shanks also housed 1200 Italian and 800 German prisoners of war between April 1945 and January 1946, with the first Germans arriving in June 1945. At the close of the war, 290,000 POWs passed through Camp Shanks as they were processed for return to their native countries. The last German to leave was on 22 July 1946. Camp Shanks closed in July 1946.  Some of the buildings were converted to housing for veterans returning to school and the former camp was renamed Shanks Village.

Units passing through Camp Shanks
(Partial Listing)

Ground Forces

 35th Engineer Combat Battalion

Army Air Forces

Other
USCGC Eagle (WIX-327)
101st Airborne Division
6888th Central Postal Directory Battalion

References

Further reading
 Gottlock, Wesley, and Barbara H. Gottlock. Lost Towns of the Hudson Valley. Charleston, SC: History Press, 2009.

External links
 Archives for The Palisades (1943-1946), bi-weekly newspaper for Camp Shanks, at Hudson River Valley Heritage Newspapers
 Archives for The Shanks Villager (1946-1953), newspaper for post-war Shanks Village, at Hudson River Valley Heritage Newspapers

Installations of the United States Army in New York (state)
Military and war museums in New York (state)
Museums in Rockland County, New York
World War II museums in the United States
World War II prisoner of war camps in the United States